Anhui University of Chinese Medicine (AHUTCM) is a comprehensive public university based in Hefei, Anhui province, China. The university provides programmes in traditional Chinese medicine as well as in the fields of technology, engineering, management and economics.

History 
The university was founded 1959. The university inherited two Chinese medical traditions within the province. The first tradition originates from southern Anhui which is called Xin’an. The other tradition originates from northern Anhui and is called Huatuo. These traditions have formed the basis of the university's traditional Chinese medicine offerings.

In 1996 Anhui University of Traditional Chinese Medicine was approved by the state council to enroll foreign students. In 1997 approval was also given to receive students from Hong Kong, Macao and Taiwan. In 2013, it has been given the name as Anhui University of Chinese Medicine while before it holds Anhui College of Traditional Chinese Medicine.

Administration

Schools and Departments
The university faculty structure is organized into the following divisions:
School of Traditional Chinese Medicine 	
School of Acupuncture & Osteology 	
School of Integrated Traditional Chinese & Western Medicine 	
School of Pharmacy 
School of Nursing 	
School of Medical Economics & Management 	
School of Medical Information Technology 	
The 1st Affiliated Hospital (The Hospital of Traditional Chinese Medicine)	
The 2nd Affiliated Hospital (The Hospital of Acupuncture & Tuina) 	
The Affiliated Hospital of Integrated Traditional Chinese & Western Medicine	
The Affiliated Neurological Hospital

References

External links
 Anhui University of Chinese Medicine

Universities and colleges in Hefei
Educational institutions established in 1959
1959 establishments in China